Jachym is a masculine given name. Notable people with the name include:

 Jáchym Topol, Czech poet (born 1962)
 Joachim Barrande (1799–1883), French geologist and paleontologist
 Joachim Löw (born 1960), German soccer coach

Masculine given names